Nuo, NUO or nuo may refer to:

 Nuo folk religion, a variant of Chinese folk religion
 Nuo opera or Nuo drama, a Chinese folk opera and ritual performance
 Nguồn language, spoken in Vietnam and Laos (ISO 639 code nuo)
 Patrick Nuo, a Swiss singer, songwriter and model

See also 
Nou (disambiguation)